Lorraine Ashbourne (born 10 April 1961) is an English actress.

Career
Ashbourne has appeared on British series and television films, including: The Street, True Dare Kiss, Thin Ice, In a Land of Plenty, Boon, Playing the Field, City Central, Peak Practice, The Bill, Pie in the Sky, Casualty, In Suspicious Circumstances, Mr Wroe's Virgins, Rich Tea and Sympathy, and London's Burning. She narrated Happy Birthday BBC Two in 2004.

As a stage actor, Lorraine regularly appeared at the Royal Exchange Theatre in Manchester, portraying roles such as Kate Hardcastle in She Stoops to Conquer and Emilia in Othello, acting in both of these alongside her husband Andy Serkis.

Personal life
On 22 July 2002, Ashbourne married actor Andy Serkis. Together they have three children, all actors – Ruby (b. 1998), Sonny (b. 2000) and Louis (b. 2004).

Filmography

Film

Television

Work in the theatre
Ashbourne's roles in the theatre include
 Miss Kate Hardcastle, She Stoops to Conquer by Oliver Goldsmith at the Royal Exchange, Manchester (1990) 
 She's in Your Hands by Georges Feydeau at the Royal Exchange, Manchester (1990)
 Jean, Your Home in the West by Rod Wooden at the Royal Exchange, Manchester (1991)
  Crystal, Doctor Heart by Peter Muller  at the Royal Exchange, Manchester (1991)
 Rhoda Nunn, The Odd Women by Michael Meyer at the Royal Exchange, Manchester (1992)
  Grushenka,The Brothers Karamazov at the Royal Exchange, Manchester (1993)
 The Kitchen by Arnold Wesker at the Royal Court Theatre, London (1994)
 Viv, Babies by Jonathon Harvey at the Royal Court Theatre, London (1994)
 Jocasta, The Phoenician Women by Euripides for the Royal Shakespeare Company (1995)
 Miss Hoyden, The Relapse by John Vanburgh for the Royal Shakespeare Company (1995)
 May, Fool For Love by Sam Shepherd at the Donmar Warehouse, London (1996)
 Emilia, Othello at the Royal Exchange, Manchester (2002)
 Olga, The Three Sisters by Anton Chekhov at the National Theatre, London (2003)
 Aunt Dan, Aunt Dan and Lemon by Wallace Shawn at the Royal Court Theatre, London (2009)

References

External links

 
 BBC

1961 births
Living people
20th-century English actresses
21st-century English actresses
Actresses from Manchester
English film actresses
English stage actresses
English television actresses
English voice actresses